Raison Oblige Theory offers an alternate explanation of exhibited behaviors widely accepted to be caused by the motive of self-verification (SVT)(William Swann, 1983). The theory addresses instances of apparent self-view confirmation strivings and details an economical description of why these behaviors occur. Focusing on the importance of the self-view and rational thought, (see self-esteem; self concept; self knowledge) Raison oblige theory (ROT) accounts for the evidence supporting SVT including the well documented seemingly mal-adaptive self verifying behaviors.

 SVT states that a person is actively motivated to confirm their existing self view regardless of the objective accuracy or valence of that view. In other words, a person wants to confirm their currently held self views above and beyond wanting this information to be accurate or positive. (see self verification for details).
 ROT challenges the existence of a motive and offers a plausible explanation which can account for all instances of self-verifying behaviors.
 The fundamentals of ROT are that people are obliged by reason to accept information that is congruent with their currently held self views and reject information that is not. The theory challenges a self-verification motive, stating that people do not want to self-verify, they simply convey, through behaviour, cognitions that accurately and honestly reflect their own self views.

ROT was developed by Aiden P. Gregg (2006).

Overview

Self verification

Self-verifying behavior includes any action which ultimately coincides with and reinforces existing self-views.
Motivation to self-enhance causes a person with positive self-views to seek positive information: This verifies positivity.
People with negative self-views, including those diagnosed with depression, show a preference for negative information: This verifies negativity.

An array of empirical evidence demonstrates numerous examples of self-verification.

People with negative self-views prefer to interact with actors who reinforce negative assessments :
 Evaluators.
 Romantic partners.
 Roommates.
 Group members

There are a number of conditions which influence the likelihood of engaging in self verification;
 Importance of a self view (swann & Pelham 2002)
 Extremity of a self view.
 Certainty of a self view.
 Perceived threat to identity; (see Swann et al., 2002)
 Intelligence of evaluator
 Importance of partner providing information (Swann, De La Ronde & Hixon, 1994)

The collective evidence of self-verifying processes and conditions has been interpreted as a motivation to self-verify.

For example; Depressed people opt to receive negative information despite positivity striving of the self-enhancement motive. This has therefore been interpreted as the result of motivation to self verify. (Giesler et al., 1996)

Origins of ROT

The theory originated from criticism of the evidence supporting SVT.

Gregg (2007) disputed that the evidence was weak and circumstantial, and importantly could be better and more economically explained via Raison oblige theory.

Both theories acknowledged the abundance of evidence showing that people behave in a way that confirms their self-view, even when this reinforcement is seemingly maladaptive. As with most psychological theories, observation of behavior provided the most compelling evidence for self verification theory.

 However, just because a person acts in a certain way does not necessarily dictate that the usually related motive for this behavior is responsible or indeed that the person wants to act this way. Self-defeating behavior such as drug abuse, which is clearly not in the person’s best interest, does not certify that there is a motive to self-defeat.

 In such an instance it is suggested that the person does not want to act against their best interests, but that they want immediate relief from negative affect (Baumeister & Scher, 1988).

ROT, unlike SVT, does not explain the observed behavior in terms of a motive. Instead it suggests that an active cognitive process obliges a person to behave in a way that honestly reflects their currently held self-views.

Underlying assumptions

Rationality is often overlooked when considering the causes of exhibited behaviors. When compared to the motives of self-enhancement, self-improvement and self-assessment the effects of rationality might be assumed to be small. However, Gregg (2007) outlines that “rationality is pervasive and motives merely qualify it”.

ROT draws upon the ability of ration to influence our behaviors and cognitions.
Evidence for the effects of rationality are easily seen yet often overlooked due to the compared power of motives.

However, if rationality did not strongly influence cognition, self-assessment would rarely be accurate and grandiose delusions would be common. As a result, self-enhancement and self-improvement would also be hindered as people would have an inaccurate self-concept and thus be unaware of whether they needed to enhance or improve. Without some sort of obligation to reasonable thought it is unlikely anyone would have an accurate self-concept or strive to make something of themselves.

 This assumption underlies ROT and is the rationale for suggesting that there is a plausible alternative explanation for the evidence of self verifying behaviors.

Hypothetical situation

When given the option to interact with person (A) who shares my self views or person (B) who does not, I will opt for person A.

ROT explains that this choice is based on whether I can earnestly believe the information to be true and representative of myself. Despite the desire for positive information to be true, if I cannot subjectively believe it then I will ignore it.

This hypothetical preference for people who share my self view and avoidance of those who don't has been empirically replicated many times (e.g. Swann, 92; swann 03; Gregg 07)

Importantly, this behavior in which we create a world which shares our self-views does not necessarily demonstrate a motive to do so (Gregg, 07). In fact, if rationality were removed it is likely we would not adhere to self views at all. Instead people would be able to choose a self view they liked and exhibit behaviors accordingly.

Every healthy person is aware of reality and adheres to an unspoken set of rules of reason permitting them to act in accordance with their physical and mental ability.
Perceptions of the world around us are bound by rational thought and evidence. Raison Oblige theory extends this binding to reason into the conceptions of our selves, i.e. self view.

Negative and positive self views

Self-esteem

Self-esteem has a very strong influence on a person’s self-view. A person with high self-esteem is more likely to have a positive self-view, whereas a person with low self-esteem is more likely to have a negative self-view. Many studies that seemingly provide evidence for a self-verifying motive use self-esteem as a variable to demonstrate that people confirm a self-view that corresponds to their level of self-esteem.

However, one can argue that this behavioral evidence is circumstantial and that the correlation does not demonstrate motivation.

If a person with low self-esteem confirmed a self-view congruent to that of low self-esteem, it does not necessarily provide evidence for motivation to confirm a self-view.
ROT claims that people are aware of their self-views and believe them to be accurate. As a result, they answer questionnaires honestly, and report their self-views as they truly see them due to an obligation to reason.

people may not want self-verifying information to be true of them and may want others to view them positively rather than negatively.

Further research needs to be undertaken to fully investigate the relationship between self views and self-esteem. (see. Gregg, 2007)
Do people with low self-esteem want critical feedback to be true; are they motivated?
Do people with low self-esteem actually want their self view to be accurate, or would they prefer a more positive self view?

ROT predicts that people with low self-esteem are bound by reason to confirm their existing self view but that they don’t necessarily like it (Gregg & De Waal-Andrews, 2007). If a motivation to self-verify were present then people with low self-esteem would not care about what their self-view was, they would instead focus on actively trying to confirm it.

Depression

Depression is accompanied by very low self-esteem and has therefore been a topic of strong interest for those investigating self verifying behaviors. Depression is always accompanied by low self-esteem but having low self-esteem does not necessarily mean you are depressed.

It argued that those suffering with depression, or with generally low negative self-views, will actively seek negative feedback in order to confirm their self-view; they find it more favourable. Giesler et al. (1996) tested this prediction by classifying participants into three separate groups; high self-esteem, low self-esteem and depressed individuals. When offered a choice of positive or negative feedback, depressed individuals chose to receive negative feedback 82% of the time, suggesting a strong desire to negatively re-affirm their self view. The seeking of negative feedback in order to self-verify has thus been argued to maintain a depressive state.

ROT challenges this interpretation and suggests that the observed behavior and maintenance of depressive state is caused by an obligation to confirm a depressive self-concept. This particular study, and many others like it can be reinterpreted using ROT. The choice of negative feedback reflects the obligation to choose information consistent with an honestly held self view.

Correlations do not equal causation; The evidence for SVT assumptions of motivation drawn from studies on depression could be circumstantial and therefore do not provide explicit proof of a motive to self-verify.

Depression, Motivation and Desire

Motivation is interlinked with desire. I am hungry therefore I am motivated to eat food; I want to eat.

In SVT studies of depressed persons they are asked whether they would like to receive favorable or unfavorable feedback on their personality. In concurrence with SVT and ROT predictions they chose the unfavorable feedback due to a negative self-view.  These studies demonstrate that self-enhancement striving has been overridden by a separate cognitive process.

If a person with high self-esteem confirms their self-view this may not be self-verification as this is more likely to be due to the self-enhancement motive. Therefore, SVT and ROT studies tend to focus on depressive participants who's verification of negative information can not be attributed to self-enhancement.

However, Recent findings show that people with depression and high self-esteem both want to receive favorable feedback more than critical feedback.

This suggests that people do not want to receive feedback that confirms their self-view. A lack of desire implies that motivation is not responsible for self-verification.

Gregg & De Waal-Andrews (2007) also show that the lower a participant's self-esteem, the less they anticipated liking critical feedback, and the less keen they were for it to be true, supporting ROT predictions.

Relationships

One example that is well explained by Raison Oblige Theory is why people stay in abusive relationships. According to Rusbult and Martz (1995) more than 40% of women who seek help from a shelter when being abused by their partner then return to living with their partner and remain in the abusive relationship.

Self-verification theory would explain this by the abused partner’s need to self-verify that the way they are being treated is deserved, in order to establish an accurate self-concept (Swann & Ely, 1984).

However the alternative explanation from Raison Oblige Theory is that an abused individual will rationalise the situation they are in and come to the conclusion that they themselves are in some way causing the abuse. This leads to the honest belief that they deserve the abuse and causes feelings of worthlessness. This results in the abused individual remaining loyal to their partner and failing to seek help, as they believe the abuse is their fault and that they need to improve in some way in order that the abuse will stop. Raison Oblige Theory also explains that the abused partner feels that they will gain no benefit from leaving an abusive relationship, as they see the abuse as their fault. This also explains why the abused individual may defend their partner should anyone outside the relationship become aware of the abuse.

Evidence

The mind is difficult to study, often multiple theories can explain a single phenomenon. A theory which explains said phenomenon  more efficiently or can explain additional behaviors is considered the more plausible theory.

There is no explicit evidence that proves the existence of a motive to self-verify. However, there is a vast expanse of evidence to show that people are obligated to reason in their thoughts.

Motivation and affect

Behavior does not always reflect motivation;

we do things we don't want to do but are obliged to do (e.g. giving up leisure time to do work)
we voluntarily refrain from doing things that we want to do (e.g. making up qualifications to secure a job we want)
These examples demonstrate that behavior does not always reflect motivation. However, they do demonstrate a cognitive overruling of desire/motive.

Motivation incurs negative affect when conditions are not met; I want to improve, I fail; I feel bad.
Striving to self verify should have an influence on affect.
A person with a negative self view should therefore be less disturbed by critical feedback than a person with high self-esteem.
 Depressed: Critical feedback negatively influences their self enhancing motive but bolsters their self verification motive.
 High self-esteem :critical feedback negatively influences their self enhancing motive(ego) and their self verification motive.

High self-esteemed people should be more emotionally disturbed by critical feedback than depressed people. However, this is not the case (Jones, 1975; Taylor & Brown, 1988.

Obligation to ration

Day to day examples of obligation to reason; Grandiose delusions are rare.
We accept new self views after a change in appearance or capabilities; we rationalize changes and challenges.
People are reasonable in thought, without reason grandiose delusions would have prevented the existence of our species; I can't be killed; I can fight this mammoth alone; I can attack this man without consequence; I am the best person in the world.

The effect of Ration on motivation

Self-assessment is bound to rational perception;

 I believe what is subjectively possible.
 Assessment is based on accurate perception, not subjective desire: Grandiose delusions are rare

Self-enhancement is bound to rational perception;

 The above-average effect is bound to the limits of subjective plausibility (Gregg, 2007).
 specific compared traits succumb to the effect much less because people are aware of their ability compared to others. Commonly held traits can be exaggerated due to a larger latitude of comparison.

See also

 Motives
 Self-knowledge
 Self verification
 Rationality
 Self-esteem
 Correlations in research

References

External links
 William B. Swann Website

Conceptions of self
Psychological theories